In electronics, signal processing, and video, ringing is oscillation of a signal, particularly in the step response (the response to a sudden change in input). Often ringing is undesirable, but not always, as in the case of resonant inductive coupling. It is also known as hunting. It is closely related to overshoot, often instigated as damping response following overshoot or undershoot, and thus the terms are at times conflated.

It is also known as ripple, particularly in electricity or in frequency domain response.

Electricity
In electrical circuits, ringing is an unwanted oscillation of a voltage or current. It happens when an electrical pulse causes the parasitic capacitances and inductances in the circuit (i.e. those that are not part of the design, but just by-products of the materials used to construct the circuit) to resonate at their characteristic frequency.  Ringing artifacts are also present in square waves; see Gibbs phenomenon.

Ringing is undesirable because it causes extra current to flow, thereby wasting energy and causing extra heating of the components; it can cause unwanted electromagnetic radiation to be emitted; it can delay arrival at a desired final state (increase settling time);  and it may cause unwanted triggering of bistable elements in digital circuits.  Ringy communications circuits may suffer falsing.

Ringing can be due to signal reflection, in which case it may be minimized by impedance matching.

Video
In video circuits, electrical ringing causes closely spaced repeated ghosts of a vertical or diagonal edge where dark changes to light or vice versa, going from left to right. In a CRT the electron beam upon changing from dark to light or vice versa instead of changing quickly to the desired intensity and staying there, overshoots and undershoots a few times. This bouncing could occur anywhere in the electronics or cabling and is often caused by or accentuated by a too high setting of the sharpness control.

Audio
Ringing can affect audio equipment in a number of ways. Audio amplifiers can produce ringing depending on their design, although the transients that can produce such ringing rarely occur in audio signals.

Transducers (i.e., microphones and loudspeakers) can also ring.  Mechanical ringing is more of a problem with loudspeakers as the moving masses are larger and less easily damped, but unless extreme they are difficult to audibly identify.

In digital audio, ringing can occur as a result of filters such as brickwall filters. Here, the ringing occurs before the transient as well as after.

Signal processing

In signal processing, "ringing" may refer to ringing artifacts: spurious signals near sharp transitions. These have a number of causes, and occur for instance in JPEG compression and as pre-echo in some audio compression.

See also 
 Microphonics
 Ripple (electrical)
 Impedance matching

References

External links 
Microphony with older video cameras

Transient response characteristics
Filter theory